Nicole Nesti (born 20 September 1997) is an Italian professional racing cyclist, who last rode for UCI Women's Team .

See also
 List of 2016 UCI Women's Teams and riders

References

External links
 

1997 births
Living people
Italian female cyclists
People from Pontedera
Sportspeople from the Province of Pisa
Cyclists from Tuscany
21st-century Italian women